Helenoscoparia is a genus of moths of the family Crambidae.

Species
Helenoscoparia helenensis (E. Wollaston, 1879)
Helenoscoparia lucidalis (Walker in Melliss, 1875)
Helenoscoparia nigritalis (Walker in Melliss, 1875)
Helenoscoparia scintillulalis (E. Wollaston, 1879)
Helenoscoparia transversalis (E. Wollaston, 1879)

References

Scopariinae
Crambidae genera